Üngör is a Turkish surname. Notable people with the surname include:

Osman Zeki Üngör (1880–1958), Turkish composer and violinist
Nazan Eckes (née Üngör; 1976), German television presenter
Uğur Ümit Üngör (born 1980), Dutch scholar of genocide and mass violence

Turkish-language surnames